Anastas is both a surname and a given name. Notable people with the name include:

Surname:
 Benjamin Anastas (born 1969), American novelist, journalist and critic born in Gloucester, Massachusetts
 Jonathan Anastas, Los Angeles-based advertising executive, musician, cofounded Boston hardcore punk bands
 Paul Anastas, the Director of Yale University's Center for Green Chemistry and Green Engineering
 Robert Anastas, former hockey coach and teacher at Wayland High School, in Wayland, Massachusetts

Given name:
 Anastas Al-Karmali (1866–1947), Lebanese Christian priest, known for his contributions to the field of Arabic linguistics
 Anastas Avramidhi-Lakçe (1821–1890), Albanian businessman and benefactor
 Anastas Byku (died 1878), Albanian publisher and journalist
 Anastas Hanania (1899–1995), Jordanian-Palestinian lawyer, judge, official and diplomat
 Anastas Ishirkov (1868–1937), Bulgarian scientist, geographer and ethnographer
 Anastas Janullatos (born 1929), Archbishop of Tirana, Durrës and All Albania
 Anastas Jovanović (1817–1899), Serbian photographer
 Anastas Kristo (born 1985), Albanian footballer
 Anastas Kullurioti (1822–1887), Arvanite and Albanian nationalist figure, publisher and writer in Greece
 Anastas Mikoyan (1895–1978), Old Bolshevik and Soviet statesman
 Anastas Petrov (born 1973), retired Bulgarian footballer and the current manager of Lokomotiv Septemvri

See also 
 Anastasi (disambiguation)
 Anastasia
 Anastasija
 Anastasio
 Anastasiou
 Anastasius (disambiguation)

References